Chervenkov is a Bulgarian masculine surname, its feminine counterpart is Chervenkova. It may refer to

Angel Chervenkov (born 1964), Bulgarian football player and manager
Slavcho Chervenkov (born 1955), Bulgarian wrestler
Valko Chervenkov (1900–1980), Bulgarian politician

Bulgarian-language surnames